The 1992 Vuelta a España was the 47th edition of the Vuelta a España, one of cycling's Grand Tours. The Vuelta began in Jerez de la Frontera, with an individual time trial on 27 April, and Stage 10 occurred on 6 May with a stage to Sabiñánigo. The race finished in Madrid on 17 May.

Stage 1
27 April 1992 — Jerez de la Frontera to Jerez de la Frontera,  (ITT)

Stage 2a
28 April 1992 — San Fernando to Jerez de la Frontera,

Stage 2b
28 April 1992 — Arcos de la Frontera to Jerez de la Frontera,  (TTT)

Stage 3
29 April 1992 — Jerez de la Frontera to Córdoba,

Stage 4
30 April 1992 — Linares to Albacete,

Stage 5
1 May 1992 — Albacete to Gandia,

Stage 6
2 May 1992 — Gandia to Benicàssim,

Stage 7
3 May 1992 — Alquerías del Niño Perdido to Oropesa,  (ITT)

Stage 8
4 May 1992 — Lleida to Pla de Beret,

Stage 9
5 May 1992 — Vielha to Luz Ardiden,

Stage 10
6 May 1992 — Luz-Saint-Sauveur to Sabiñánigo,

References

1992 Vuelta a España
Vuelta a España stages